is a global, Tokyo-based electrical equipment manufacturing company, developing and manufacturing power and telecommunication systems products, including devices for optical fibers, such as cutters and splicers.

History 
Fujikura was founded by Zenpachi Fujikura when he began manufacturing silk and cotton insulated winding wires in 1885. In 1910 Fujikura Electric Wire Corporation was established with Tomekichi Fujikura, Zenpachi's younger brother, acting as the company's representative. Over the years the company expanded both in Japan and overseas and as of 2013 the company had subsidiaries across Europe, Asia, North and South America and North Africa.

The company is listed on the Tokyo Stock Exchange and is a constituent of the Nikkei 225 stock index.

In February 2014 the company received an order of special large core fibers from Tokyo University for the Subaru Telescope located on Mauna Kea, Hawaii.

Subsidiaries 
Major affiliates include Fujikura Rubber Ltd. and Fujikura Parachute (the latter is also known as Fujikura Aviation Equipment Corporation).

Business segments and products

 Power and telecommunication systems segment
 Optical fibers and fiber cables, optical fusion splicers, network equipment, optical parts, communication and power cables, industrial, bare, aluminum and enameled wires
 Electronics segment
 Flexible printed circuit, membrane switches, HDD parts, connectors, electron wires, sensors, electronic thermal components, wafer-level packaging
 Automotive segment
 Wire harnesses and other electrical components for automobiles
 Real estate segment
 Leasing of offices, provision of real estate brokerage services and professional lessons and golf school services
Defense segment
Provision of products and services in this segment is primarily dealt with by Fujikura Parachute and Fujikura Rubber Ltd. This includes but is not limited to survival equipment, emergency life-saving devices such as life vests & inflatable life rafts, parachutes for emergency (e.g. bailing out of a stricken aircraft via Ejection seat or other means, insertion into remote/cut off areas by emergency personnel such as smokejumpers), airborne and sporting (including Paragliding) usage, and aircraft braking systems (e.g. for the Japan Air Self-Defense Force's F-2 fighter).

Representative offices and production departments 
The total number of employees worldwide is 52,409, as of mid-2013.

Together with representative offices Fujikura has:
 Head Office and 21 production and representative offices in Japan;
 13 manufacturing and representative offices in Asia;
 30 manufacturing and representative offices in America;
 13 manufacturing and representative offices in China;
 21 manufacturing and representative offices in Europe and North Africa.

References

External links
 Official website 

Electronics companies of Japan
Wire and cable manufacturers
Manufacturing companies established in 1885
Telecommunications companies established in 1885
Japanese companies established in 1885
Manufacturing companies based in Tokyo
Companies listed on the Tokyo Stock Exchange
Defense companies of Japan
Japanese brands